Fahad Al-Jumayah (born 10 May 1995) is a Saudi Arabian professional footballer who plays as a right-midfielder for Pro League side Abha.

References

External links

1995 births
Living people
People from Eastern Province, Saudi Arabia
Association football wingers
Saudi Arabian footballers
Saudi Arabia youth international footballers
Al-Sadd FC (Saudi football club) players
Al Nassr FC players
Abha Club players
Saudi Professional League players